Santi Buglioni, byname of Santi di Michele (1494 - 27 November 1576) was an Italian sculptor, the nephew and collaborator of Benedetto Buglioni.

After Luca della Robbia had moved to France to escape the plague, the Buglioni family inherited from him the secrets of the new  pottery glaze  techniques. According to Giorgio Vasari, the Buglioni learnt della Robbia's secret through a woman who frequented his house.

Works attributed to Santi Buglioni include the Deposition in the St. Francis Museum of Greve in Chianti, the cyborium in the church of San Silvestro at Convertoie, the pavement of the Biblioteca Laurenziana and of Palazzo Vecchio of Florence. Around 1520-1530 he executed the Noli me tangere at the Bargello and the façade decoration of the Ospedale del Ceppo at Pistoia. From 1539 is the monument to the condottiero Giovanni dalle Bande Nere, together with Niccolò Tribolo, followed by a glazed  pottery for the Abbey of Vallombrosa.

Buglioni, who had become blind in his late years, died in 1576 and was buried in the church of Santa Maria Maggiore in Florence. His descendants include Vincenzo Viviani, a disciple and biographer of Galileo Galilei.

External links
Page at Chianti Museum website 

1494 births
1576 deaths
16th-century Italian sculptors
Italian male sculptors